Černina is a village and municipality in Humenné District in the Prešov Region of eastern Slovakia. The mayor is Silvia Žinčáková (SNS).

History
In historical records the village was first mentioned in 1492.

Geography
The municipality lies at an altitude of 264 metres and covers an area of 7.4 km².
It has a population of about 185 people.

External links
 
 https://web.archive.org/web/20070513023228/http://www.statistics.sk/mosmis/eng/run.html

Villages and municipalities in Humenné District
Zemplín (region)